AgniKul Cosmos Private Limited is an Indian aerospace manufacturer based in National Center for Combustion R&D (NCRD) of IIT Madras, Chennai. The start up aims to develop and launch its own small-lift launch vehicle such as the Agnibaan, capable of placing  payload into a  orbit. The first commercial launch was expected in 2022. However, no launch happened in that year.

History 
Till end of 2020, the company had raised almost $4 million and headed towards Indian Space Research Organisation for advisory. A Non-Disclosure Agreement (NDA) was signed with Department of Space to obtain government's technological assistance in development of launch vehicles. Although the company entered an agreement with Alaska Aerospace Corp. to launch rocket from Kodiak Launch Complex as a commercial launch pad to test rockets was not available in India, the deal eventually fizzled out as no progress was made with the vehicle. AgniKul has received investment from personal capacity of Anand Mahindra, chairman of Mahindra Group. Although, amount was not specified.

AgniKul signed a framework agreement with the Department of Space in September 2021 for access to ISRO facilities and technical expertise for the development of its two-stage small-satellite Agnibaan launch vehicle. On 7 November 2022, Agnikul Cosmos bought its first Flight Termination System (FTS) from ISRO. It will be used in Agnibaan scheduled for launch from Satish Dhawan Space Centre.

Development of engines 
In February 2021, Agnikul test fired its semi-cryogenic rocket engine Agnilet which will power second stage of its rocket Agnibaan for the first time. The engine has been developed in single-piece through 3D printing with no assembled parts.
 On 8 November 2022, Agnilet was successfully test fired for a few seconds on Vertical Test Facility, Thumba Equatorial Rocket Launching Station (TERLS), at Vikram Sarabhai Space Center (VSSC) to validate the design and manufacturing methodology used in the development process. AgniKul Cosmos holds the patent for design and manufacturing of single-piece rocket engine. The first dedicated factory to manufacture large number of 3D printed rocket engines is in IIT Madras Research Park.
On 7th February 2023, flight acceptance test of Angilet for Agnikul's controlled sub-orbital flight was successfully conducted. The engine was completely manufactured at Agnikul's Rocket Factory - 1. In this particular test, engine was fired over and above the mission burn time as required for flight acceptance.

Launch vehicle 
Agnibaan is envisaged to be a mobile launch system capable of placing a  satellite into a  orbit. It will use clustered engines on first stage in various configurations depending upon the payload and will only use LOX and Kerosene based engines. The rocket is supposed to be manufactured by 3D printing at whole.

Launch pad and mission control centre 
AgniKul Cosmos inaugurated first private launchpad and mission control centre in India at the Satish Dhawan Space Centre (SDSC) in Sriharikota on 28 November 2022. The launch and mission control centre are 4 km apart from one another. At present, the launch pad can handle liquid stage launch vehicle. All the critical systems performing functions at Agnikul launchpad (ALP) and the Agnikul mission control center (AMCC) have high degree of redundancy to ensure 100% operationality. ISRO’s range operations team will monitor key flight safety parameters during launches from ALP while AMCC can share critical data with ISRO’s Mission Control Center. Both the facilities have support of Indian Space Research Organisation (ISRO) and Indian National Space Promotion and Authorisation Centre (IN-SPACe).

See also 
 
 Skyroot Aerospace
Bellatrix Aerospace
 INSPACe
 Space industry of India
 Indian space program
 Agnibaan

Notes

References 

Aerospace companies
Rockets and missiles
Indian private spaceflight companies
Private spaceflight companies
Rocket engine manufacturers of India
Commercial launch service providers
Spacecraft manufacturers
Indian companies established in 2017
Indian brands
Space programme of India
2017 establishments in Tamil Nadu